Kalateh-ye Ali Morad (also Romanized as Kalāteh-ye ‘Alī Morād) is a village in Binalud Rural District, in the Central District of Nishapur County, Razavi Khorasan Province, Iran. At the 2006 census, its population was 33, in 7 families.

References 

Populated places in Nishapur County